Asian Hispanic and Latino Americans are Americans of Asian ancestry that speak the Spanish or Portuguese language natively and/or are from Spain or Latin America, respectively. This includes Hispanic and Latino Americans who identify themselves (or were officially classified by the United States Census Bureau, Office of Management and Budget and other US government agencies) as Asian Americans.

Hispanidad, which is independent of race, is the only ethnic category, as opposed to racial category, which is officially unified by the US Census Bureau. The distinction made by government agencies for those within the population of any official race category, including "Asian American", is between those who report Hispanic and Latino ethnic backgrounds and all others who do not. In the case of Asian Americans, these two groups are respectively termed Asian Hispanic and Latinos and non-Hispanic or Latino Asian Americans, the former being those who say Asian ancestry from Spain or Iberian-speaking America and the latter consisting of an ethnically diverse collection of all others who are classified as Asian Americans that do not report Spanish or Latin American ethnic backgrounds.

Population
In the 2000 US Census, 119,829 Hispanic and Latino Americans identified as being of Asian race alone. In 2006, the Census Bureau's American Community Survey estimated them at 154,694, while its Population Estimates, which are official, put them at 277,704. In the 2010 Census, there were 598,146 Asian Hispanic and Latino Americans, including those who are multiracial in origin.

Filipino Americans, often have Spanish surnames from the Alphabetical Catalog of Surnames, due to an 1849 decree.

Notable people
 Miguel del Aguila, American composer
 Tatyana Ali, American actress and R&B singer
 Daniella Alonso, American actress
 Fred Armisen, American actor and comedian
 Tyson Beckford, American male model and actor
 Steve Caballero, pro skateboarder
 Franklin Chang Díaz, former NASA astronaut
 Sonia Chang-Díaz, politician
 Alex Cabrera Suzuki, Venezuelan professional baseball player
 Chris Cheng, professional marksman
 Arthur Chin, United States Air Force pilot
 Benjamin Brian Castro, actor, singer, visual artist and YouTube sensation
 Nikita Dragun , YouTuber, makeup artist, beauty influencer, TikToker
 Carlos Galvan, singer
 Enrique Iglesias, singer
 Kelis, singer
 Kim Samuel, American-born South Korean singer
 Wallace Loh, President of the University of Maryland
 Kamala Lopez, American actress
 Bruno Mars, singer
 Chino Moreno, frontman of Deftones
 Asia Nitollano, singer
 Sigrid Nunez, writer
 Kyoung H. Park, playwright
 Chino Rodriguez, Latin music record executive
 Tao Rodríguez-Seeger, musician
 Jessica Sanchez, singer
 Harry Shum Jr., actor
 Elmelindo Rodrigues Smith, Medal of Honor recipient
 Jasmine Villegas, singer
 Cassie Ventura, singer, model and actress
 Amruta Khanvilkar, actress
 Karen Olivo, Tony Award-winning actor

See also
 Asian Americans
 Punjabi Mexican Americans
 Latino
 List of Latino Americans
 White Latino Americans
 Black Latino Americans

References

External links

 PBS: A CULTURAL IDENTITY An essay on the meaning of the Hispanic label. By Richard Rodriguez.

 
Hispanic and Latino American
Hispanic
Ethnic groups in the United States